Joseph Edwards Kopcha (December 23, 1905 – July 29, 1986) was an American professional football player who was a guard for eight seasons in the National Football League (NFL), primarily with the Chicago Bears.

Kopcha attended the University of Tennessee at Chattanooga, where he studied to become an obstetrician, and played professional football in order to fund his university studies. Kopcha played for the Detroit Lions when he obtained an internship at Harper Hospital, after previously studying at the Rush Medical College when playing for the Bears. Kopcha used his knowledge to redesign the shoulder pads worn by players, with his basic designs still in use today.

Personal life
Kopcha was of Polish descent.

References

External links

1905 births
1986 deaths
American football offensive guards
American people of Polish descent
Chattanooga Mocs football players
Chicago Bears players
Detroit Lions players
People from Whiting, Indiana
Whiting High School alumni